List of MPs elected in the United Kingdom general election, 1802 

This is a list of MPs elected to the House of Commons at the 1802 United Kingdom general election and their replacements returned at subsequent by-elections, arranged by constituency. The second United Kingdom Parliament was summoned to meet on 31 August 1802 and was dissolved on 24 October 1806.



By-elections 
List of United Kingdom by-elections (1801–06)

See also
1802 United Kingdom general election
List of parliaments of the United Kingdom
Members of the 2nd UK Parliament from Ireland
Unreformed House of Commons

References

1802
1802 in the United Kingdom
1802